Sarı yataq or Sarıyatag or Sariyatag or Sari Yatag may refer to:
Sarıyataq, Azerbaijan
Sari Yataq, Iran